"" is the national anthem of São Tomé and Príncipe. The anthem, adopted in 1975, was written by Alda Neves da Graça do Espírito Santo (1926–2010) and composed by Manuel dos Santos Barreto de Sousa e Almeida (born 1933).

Lyrics

Notes

References

External links
Information page about Independência total on the website of the government of São Tomé and Príncipe
Streaming audio of Independência total, with information and lyrics (archive link)

African anthems
Portuguese-language songs
National symbols of São Tomé and Príncipe
São Tomé and Príncipe music
National anthem compositions in E-flat major